Doret is a surname. Notable people with the surname include:

 Gustave Doret (1866–1943), Swiss composer and conductor
 Michael Doret (born 1946), American designer and illustrator
 Thomas Doret (born 1996), Belgian actor

See also
 Boret